Matías Román Comas (born 19 July 1999) is an Argentine professional footballer who plays as an attacking midfielder for Patronato.

Career
Comas is a product of the Patronato youth system. He made the breakthrough into the first-team of Gustavo Álvarez in 2020, initially appearing during pre-season. He chose the squad number 80, due to his admiration for Brazilian footballer Ronaldinho; who wore the same number during his time at Milan. Comas was an unused substitute for Copa de la Liga Profesional home matches with Huracán and Gimnasia y Esgrima in November, before appearing for his senior debut in the same competition on 14 December during a four-goal loss away to Rosario Central; replacing Mauro González after thirty-six minutes to play alongside brother Lautaro.

Personal life
Comas' brother, Lautaro, is also a professional footballer; he too started at Patronato.

Career statistics
.

Notes

References

External links

1999 births
Living people
People from Paraná, Entre Ríos
Argentine footballers
Association football midfielders
Argentine Primera División players
Club Atlético Patronato footballers
Sportspeople from Entre Ríos Province